Kelsea (stylized in all lowercase) is the third studio album by American country pop artist Kelsea Ballerini. The album was released on March 20, 2020. Kelsea debuted at numbers 2 and 12 on the Top Country Albums and Billboard 200 charts, respectively. It spawned four official singles "Homecoming Queen?", "The Other Girl", "Hole in the Bottle", and "Half of My Hometown" as well as two promotional singles "Club" and "LA".

Background
Ballerini announced via Instagram in July 2019 that her third album was complete. The album title and its release date were revealed on January 20, 2020. The album's tracklist was revealed on February 27, 2020.

Ballerini wrote or co-wrote all 13 tracks on the album. Two tracks have credited guest vocalists: "The Other Girl" is a duet with Halsey and "Half of My Hometown" features harmony vocals from Kenny Chesney.

Singles
The lead single of the album was "Homecoming Queen?" which was released on September 6, 2019. Ballerini sang it at the 53rd Annual Country Music Association Awards in November.

"The Other Girl," featuring Halsey, was released on April 20, 2020 as the album's second single.

On February 28, 2020, "Hole in the Bottle" was released as a promotional single but was later made an official single on May 27, 2020. A remix featuring Canadian singer Shania Twain was released November 13, 2020.

"Half of My Hometown," featuring Kenny Chesney, was released on April 19, 2021 as the album's fourth single.

Promotional singles
"Club" was released on November 8, 2019 as the album's first promotional single. A music video was released two days later, on November 10, 2019. "LA", the album's second promotional single, was released on January 24, 2020.

Track listing

Notes
 All track titles are stylized in all lowercase.

Personnel
Adapted from the Kelsea liner notes.

Vocals

 Kelsea Ballerini – lead vocals (all tracks), background vocals (tracks 2, 4–7, 9-13)
 Megan Boardman – background vocals (track 2)
 Kelly Bolton – background vocals (track 2)
 Kenny Chesney - background vocals (track 9)
 Ross Copperman – background vocals (tracks 4-6), gang vocals (track 7)
 Tarryn Feldman – background vocals (track 2)
 Nicolle Galyon – background vocals (track 3), gang vocals (track 7)

 Maggie Heintzman – background vocals (track 2)
 Hillary Lindsey – background vocals (tracks 5, 8)
 Julia Michaels – background vocals (track 11)
 Jensen Nicolaisen – background vocals (track 2)
 Tayla Parx – background vocals (track 1)
 Jimmy Robbins – background vocals (tracks 2, 3, 13), gang vocals (track 7)

Instruments

 Tom Bukovac – electric guitar (track 4)
 Ross Copperman – acoustic guitar, bass guitar, electric guitar, keyboards
 Dan Dugmore – pedal steel guitar (track 4)
 Fred Eltringham – drums (track 4)
 Alicia Enstrom – violin (track 6)
 Mark Hill – bass guitar (track 4)
 Austin Hoke – cello (track 6)
 Charlie Judge – keyboards (track 1)

 Chris Kimmerer – drums (track 12)
 Elizabeth Lamb – viola (track 6)
 Miles McPherson – drums (tracks 1, 8)
 Nir Z – drums (tracks 2, 11)
 Jimmy Robbins – acoustic guitar, banjo, bass guitar, electric guitar, mandolin
 Jimmie Lee Sloas – bass guitar (tracks 1, 8)
 Kristin Weber – violin (track 6)
 Derek Wells – acoustic guitar, banjo, dobro, electric guitar (tracks 1, 5, 8, 12), pedal steel guitar (track 5)

Production
 Dan Grech-Marguerat – mixing, additional programming
 Luke Burgoyne – assistant engineer
 Charles Haydon Hicks – assistant engineer
 Josh Ditty – assistant engineer (tracks 1, 8)
 Kam Luchterhand – assistant engineer (track 6)
 Trey Keller – digital editing (tracks 4–7, 9, 10)
 Dave Kutch – mastering (Mastering Palace; New York, NY)

Imagery
 Ashley Kohorst – Art direction and design
 Peggy Sirota – photography

Charts

Weekly charts

Year-end charts

Certifications

References

2020 albums
Kelsea Ballerini albums
Black River Entertainment albums
Pop albums by American artists
Albums produced by Jimmy Robbins
Albums produced by Ross Copperman
Albums produced by Shane McAnally